Eight Ways is the fifth studio album by Norwegian metal band Madder Mortem, released on 16 June 2009. It was their second CD release on Peaceville Records.

Track listing

Personnel 
Madder Mortem
Agnete M. Kirkevaag – lead vocals
BP M. Kirkevaag – guitars, mandolin, backing vocals
Odd E. Ebbesen – guitars
Tormod L. Moseng – bass guitar, double bass, backing vocals
Mads Solås – drums, percussion, backing vocals

Production
Produced by Madder Mortem
Engineered by BP M. Kirkevaag
Mixed by BP M. Kirkevaag
Mastering – Maor Appelbaum at Maor Appelbaum Mastering, California

Reception 

On Sputnikmusic, the album is rated 4 out of 5 or "Excellent":

"Eight Ways is hard to pinpoint as far as its status of enjoyment goes because its melding of unconventionalities with dynamic clichés is frankly remarkable. Think what you may, you've never heard something like this before. [...] Madder Mortem is without doubt a black sheep in the metal scene, and that's just how it should be because not everyone can appreciate such rare flowers."

Likewise, Metalunderground.com also rates the album 4 out of 5, "Excellent":
"Their fifth studio album, 'Eight Ways,' is the type of album that takes a few listens to sink in, but once it does, the result is one of deep satisfaction.
[...] The band has a tendency to jam a lot of content into one song, and with the average song length being over five minutes, the first listen may not sink in all the sharp turns taken with the songwriting. The transition from smooth jazz to harsh guitar tones and screaming vocals may prove to be jarring in the beginning, but as time goes on, everything starts to click and the album begins to make sense, piece by piece, minute by minute."

References 

2009 albums
Madder Mortem albums
Peaceville Records albums